Twenties Girl is a 2009 book by Sophie Kinsella (pen name of Madeline Wickham). Her fourth "stand-alone" book, it was published by Bantam Press.

Plot
Lara is a twenty-seven-year-old girl. At the funeral of her great-aunt Sadie, she gets visited by her ghost, in form of a bold, demanding, Charleston-dancing girl. Sadie has one particular request: she can't rest without her precious dragonfly necklace, and demands that Lara find it for her. But Lara is besieged with problems of her own, such as her uncertain future as co-founder of her own headhunting agency, and the fact that she was recently dumped by Josh, the love of her life.

Lara, coerced by Sadie, embarks upon an arduous journey to find said necklace, but in the process of doing so ends up accomplishing so much more. She unravels the ugly truth behind her uncle's enormous success, inadvertently unearths a long-lost love story enshrouded by the cobwebs of time, and even manages to get entangled in a love story of her own.

In the end, Sadie is finally at peace after Lara finds the necklace and lays it on her 105 year old body.

References
Found in Charleston in the 1920s

External links
 Sophie Kinsella, UK Website
 Sophie Kinsella, US Website
 http://www.sophiekinsellabooks.com/160921/Twenties-Girl:-A-Novel-by-Sophie-Kinsella
Goodreads reviews

2009 British novels
Novels by Madeline Wickham
Chick lit novels
Works published under a pseudonym
Bantam Press books